Matz's Ruby Interpreter or Ruby MRI (also called CRuby) was the reference implementation of the Ruby programming language named after Ruby creator Yukihiro Matsumoto ("Matz"). Until the specification of the Ruby language in 2011, the MRI implementation was considered the de facto reference, especially since an independent attempt to create the specification (RubySpec) had failed. Starting with Ruby 1.9, and continuing with Ruby 2.x and above, the official Ruby interpreter has been YARV ("Yet Another Ruby VM").

The latest stable version is Ruby 3.2.0

History
Yukihiro Matsumoto ("Matz") started working on Ruby on February 24, 1993, and released it to the public in 1995.  "Ruby" was named as a gemstone because of a joke within Matsumoto's circle of friends alluding to the name of the Perl programming language.

The 1.8 branch has been maintained until June 2013, and 1.8.7 releases have been released since April 2008. This version provides bug fixes, but also many Ruby feature enhancements.

The RubySpec project has independently created a large test suite that captures 1.8.6/1.8.7/1.9  behavior as a reference conformance tool. Ruby MRI 1.9.2 passed over 99% of RubySpec., MRI Ruby 2.2 crashed on one of the tests. As a result of the limited uptake by the MRI developers, RubySpec project has been discontinued as of end of 2014.

Licensing terms
Prior to release 1.9.3, the Ruby interpreter and libraries were distributed as dual-licensed free and open source software, under the GNU General Public License or the Ruby License.  In release 1.9.3, Ruby's License has been changed from a dual license with GPLv2 to a dual license with the 2-clause BSD license.

Operating systems
Ruby MRI is available for the following operating systems (supported Ruby versions can be different):

 Acorn RISC OS
 Amiga
 BeOS / Haiku
 DOS (32-bit)
 IBM i
 Internet Tablet OS
 Linux
 Mac OS X
 Microsoft Windows 95/98/2000/2003/NT/XP/Vista/7/8/10
 Microsoft Windows CE
 MorphOS
 OS/2
 OpenVMS
 Syllable
 Symbian OS
 Blue Gene/L compute node kernel
 Most flavors of Unix

This list may not be exhaustive.

PowerPC64 performance Since version 2.2.1, Ruby MRI performance on PowerPC64 was improved.

Criticism
Commonly noted limitations include:

Backward compatibility Version 1.9 and 1.8 have slight semantic differences. The release of Ruby 2.0 sought to avoid such a conflict between different versions.

Threaded programs cannot use more than a single CPU core due to the Global interpreter lock.

See also

 YARV

References

External links
 

Free compilers and interpreters
Free software programmed in C
Ruby (programming language)